The Christian Democratic Workers Association (Christlich-Demokratische Arbeitnehmerschaft) (CDA) is an association connected with the Christian Democratic Union with the substantive focus on "social policy". Another competing self-designation is "CDU social committee".

The Christian-Socials (Christlich-Soziale) are one of the three major groups within the CDU in addition to the Liberals and the Conservatives. Thus social committees from the Christian-social movement have emerged within the CDU.

The headquarters of the Foundation is Königswinter in Bonn, while there is an office in Berlin.

History 

The CDA was created after the Second World War, by mostly Christian trade unionists in the industrial areas of North Rhine-Westphalia. In the early years the CDA's program concerned mainly issues such as the health and safety of workers and their conditions in the factories. Since the association adopted the Offenburger Declaration in 1967, its focus moved to wider societal issues. Priorities of the CDA today cover pension, health and family policy,  in addition to labor and social policy.

Internal Structure 

Subsidiary bodies of the CDU social committees include its Youth movement, the Youth CDA, former Young Workers Association and the Association of Women in the CDA. The Youth CDA was founded in 1947 also in Herne. The Youth CDA is organized into 15 regional associations, all members of the CDA are up to 35 years of age are automatically a member of the Youth CDA.

Chairmen 

 1947–1949 Johannes Albers 
 1949–1958 Jakob Kaiser 
 1958 Karl Arnold 
 1958–1963 Johannes Albers 
 1963–1977 Hans Katzer 
 1977–1987 Norbert Blüm 
 1987–1993 Ulf Fink 
 1993 Werner Schreiber 
 1994–2001 Rainer Eppelmann 
 2001–2004 Hermann-Josef Arentz
 2004–2005 Gerald Weiß 
 Since 2005, Karl-Josef Laumann

References 

Christian Democratic Union of Germany